Ben Ciaran Torrance (born 18 July 1994)  is a Scottish badminton player.

Achievements

BWF International Challenge/Series 
Men's singles

  BWF International Challenge tournament
  BWF International Series tournament
  BWF Future Series tournament

References

External links 
 
 

1994 births
Living people
Sportspeople from Irvine, North Ayrshire
Scottish male badminton players